Marmolada (Ladin: Marmolèda; German: Marmolata) is a mountain in northeastern Italy  and the highest mountain of the Dolomites (a section of the Alps). It lies between the borders of Trentino and Veneto. The Marmolada is an ultra-prominent peak (Ultra), known as the "Queen of the Dolomites".

Geography
It consists of a ridge running west to east. Towards the south it breaks suddenly into sheer cliffs, forming a rock face several kilometres long. On the north side there is a comparatively flat glacier, the only large glacier in the Dolomites (the Marmolada Glacier, Ghiacciaio della Marmolada).

The ridge is composed of several summits, decreasing in altitude from west to east: Punta Penia , Punta Rocca , Punta Ombretta , Monte Serauta , and Pizzo Serauta . An aerial tramway goes to the top of Punta Rocca. During the ski season the Marmolada's main ski run is opened for skiers and snowboarders alike, making it possible to ski down into the valley.

History
Paul Grohmann made the first ascent in 1864, along the north route. The south face was climbed for the first time in 1901 by Beatrice Tomasson, Michele Bettega and Bartolo Zagonel.

Until the end of World War I the border between Austria-Hungary and Italy ran over Marmolada, so it formed part of the front line during that conflict. Austro-Hungarian soldiers were quartered in deep tunnels bored into the northern face's glacier, and Italian soldiers were quartered on the south face's rocky precipices. It was also the site of fierce mine warfare on the Italian Front. As glaciers retreat, soldiers' remains and belongings are occasionally discovered.

On July 3, 2022, a serac collapsed which led to the sliding downstream of over 200 000 m3 of ice and debris, killing eleven people and wounding eight more.

Gallery

See also
 Golden age of alpinism
 Italian front (World War I)
 List of Italian regions by highest point
 White Friday (1916)
 White War

References

External links 

 Computer generated summit panoramas North South  Index
 Marmolada on Hike.uno

Marmolada